The Big Dish may refer to;
The Big Dish (band), a Scottish pop/rock band
The Big Dish (game show), a children's game show
The Big Dish (solar thermal), a Parabolic Concentrator for Solar Thermal Power

See also 
Big ugly dish, a TVRO satellite dish